Michael Jeffrey Gilden (September 22, 1962 – December 5, 2006) was an American actor with dwarfism.

Biography

The -tall Gilden had a form of dwarfism. He lived and worked in Los Angeles.

Gilden performed or did stunt work in a variety of television series and films, including Charmed, CSI: Crime Scene Investigation, Family Law, Cybill, NCIS and Pulp Fiction (the page in the Jack Rabbit Slim scene), and had a role as an Ewok in the film Return of the Jedi. He appeared twice in Season 4 of the hit series NCIS. Gilden was also a Financial Advisor.

In August 1997, he met Meredith Eaton through mutual friends in Atlanta, Georgia.  Gilden encouraged Eaton to pursue a career in acting, and she became an actress in 1999. The couple married on May 20, 2001.

Gilden died by suicide on December 5, 2006, in his Los Angeles home. He was 44.

Filmography

Film

References

External links

Michael Gilden at Find a Grave

1962 births
2006 deaths
2006 suicides
20th-century American male actors
Actors with dwarfism
American male film actors
Burials at Eden Memorial Park Cemetery
Male actors from Los Angeles
Suicides by hanging in California